Stakkato is the alias of Swede Philip Gabriel Pettersson, the alleged perpetrator of a worldwide cyber attack known to have occurred from at least December 2003 until May 2005, targeting many sites on the Internet including the US Military, White Sands Missile Range, NASA, a number of US academic institutions (known to include Caltech, Stanford University, San Diego Supercomputer Center, and UIUC), and a number of non-US academic institutions (known to include Uppsala University in Sweden and University College Cork in Ireland) and several other Internet locations.

By using locally based kernel exploits (a sophisticated technique that requires a high knowledge level and advanced development skills), Stakkato managed to elevate its user privileges and gain control of various systems within numerous government agencies and private sector enterprises.

Via stolen login credentials Stakkato was able to gain access to these systems for well over two years. Finally, Stakkato was able to gain access to Cisco Corporation's router internetwork operating system (IOS) source code, which enabled the attacker to develop  custom exploits, rootkits (backdoors), and enhanced control of routers around the world.

Philip Gabriel Pettersson from Uppsala, Sweden, then 16 years old, was questioned over the attack in March 2005, while possible accomplices were searched in Sweden, Britain, and elsewhere in Europe. Pettersson was indicted with five felonies in May 2009, and in February 2010 his prosecution was transferred to Swedish authorities.

See also
Byzantine Foothold
Moonlight Maze
Solar Sunrise
Titan Rain

References

External links
 Bodmer, Kilger, Carpenter, & Jones (2012). Reverse Deception: Organized Cyber Threat Counter-Exploitation. New York: McGraw-Hill Osborne Media. , 
Swede indicted for NASA-CISCO hacks
Hacker infiltrated government computers, CNN, 10 May 2005 
The Stakkato Intrusions - What happened and what have we learned?, technical presentation at CCGrid06, 17 May 2006
Tempting Fate, Abe Singer, ;login: February 2005. Description of attacks and response at SDSC.
Swedish Notice to DOJ concerning possible prosecution of stakkato, DOJ, 5 February 2010

1989 births
Living people
Computer criminals
Swedish criminals
Hacking (computer security)